Lucifer Rising and Other Sound Tracks is an album by Jimmy Page, released on vinyl record only exclusively through his web page on the Spring Equinox of 2012. It contained music Page produced, but never used, for the Kenneth Anger film, Lucifer Rising.

Track listing
Side A

"Lucifer Rising - Main Track" (20:29)

Side B

"Incubus" (1:43)
"Damask" (2:00)
"Unharmonics" (2:04)
"Damask - Ambient" (2:02)
"Lucifer Rising - Percussive Return" (3:21)

References

Jimmy Page albums
2012 soundtrack albums
Albums produced by Jimmy Page
Self-released albums